Diaperville is a census-designated place in the town of Sanborn, Ashland County, Wisconsin, United States. Its population was 70 as of the 2010 census. Diaperville was also called Old Odanah.

References

Bad River Band of the Lake Superior Tribe of Chippewa Indians
Census-designated places in Ashland County, Wisconsin
Census-designated places in Wisconsin